Syed Maratab Ali Shah (25 March 1982) is a two time Pakistani Asian Games bronze medalist. He is also a two-time South Asian Games gold medalist in wushu.

Career

2006
At the 2006 Asian Games in Doha, Ali won a bronze medal in the Sanshou -65 kg category. At the 10th South Asian Games held in Colombo, he won a gold medal in the same category.

2010
At the 11th South Asian Games held in Dhaka, Bangladesh, Ali won his second successive gold medal. At the 2010 Asian Games, Ali competed in the Sanshou (-60 kg) category and lost by AV to Indian, Bimoljit Singh.

2015
Syed Maratib ali shah opened his very own martial arts (wushu kungfu) club in lahore Pakistan.

References

1982 births
Living people
Asian Games bronze medalists for Pakistan
Pakistani sanshou practitioners
Asian Games medalists in wushu
Wushu practitioners at the 2006 Asian Games
Wushu practitioners at the 2010 Asian Games
Wushu practitioners at the 2014 Asian Games
Wushu practitioners at the 2018 Asian Games
Medalists at the 2006 Asian Games
Medalists at the 2014 Asian Games
South Asian Games gold medalists for Pakistan
South Asian Games medalists in wushu
21st-century Pakistani people